Events from the year 1731 in Scotland.

Incumbents 

 Secretary of State for Scotland: vacant

Law officers 
 Lord Advocate – Duncan Forbes
 Solicitor General for Scotland – John Sinclair, jointly with Charles Erskine

Judiciary 
 Lord President of the Court of Session – Lord North Berwick
 Lord Justice General – Lord Ilay
 Lord Justice Clerk – Lord Grange

Events 
 Cumbernauld House, to designs by William Adam, is built.
 Publication in Edinburgh of The Poor Man's Physician, or The receipts of the famous John Moncrief of Tippermalloch; being a choice collection of simple and easy remedies for most distempers, very useful for all persons, especially those of a poorer condition ... To which is added The method of curing the small pox and scurvy, by the eminent Dr. Archibald Pitcairn (3rd edition).

Births 
 1 July – Adam Duncan, admiral, victor of the Battle of Camperdown (died 1804 in Northumberland)
 date unknown – William Aiton, botanist (died 1793)

Deaths 
 28 April – Robert Gordon, merchant and philanthropist (born 1668)
 6 November – James Smith, architect (b. c.1645)

See also 

 Timeline of Scottish history

References 

 
Years of the 18th century in Scotland
Scotland
1730s in Scotland